Sherman Township is a township in Dickinson County, Kansas, USA.  As of the 2000 census, its population was 147.

Geography
According to the USGS, it contains two cemeteries: Green Ridge and Jones.

Further reading

References

 USGS Geographic Names Information System (GNIS)

External links
 City-Data.com

Townships in Dickinson County, Kansas
Townships in Kansas